Robert Santos III (born October 3, 1985) is an American professional racing driver from Franklin, Massachusetts. He graduated in 2004 from Tri-County Regional Vocational Technical High School. Santos, nicknamed "Bobby New England", is the grandson of Bobby Santos, a former modified racer.  His sister, Erica Santos, is also a racecar driver. He is the cousin of former University of New Hampshire quarterback Ricky Santos.

Early career 
Before stock cars, Santos was a successful midget racer. He raced in the Northeastern Midget Association, USAC, PRA Big Car, and ISMA.  He had the most wins of any driver in the USAC National Midget Tour in 2006, collecting five wins, including a win at O'Reilly Raceway Park on the Night Before the 500. He was signed to Bill Davis Racing.

ARCA career 
In 2006, Santos made his stock car debut at Iowa Speedway for Bill Davis Racing in the #02 Dodge. He started 10th and finished 6th.  Bobby returned to ARCA in 2007 for Bill Davis, now in a Toyota Camry. He won Toyota's first stock car pole at USA International Speedway in Lakeland, Florida.  While leading the race, he was involved in an incident with a lapped car and did not finish. He returned at Nashville Superspeedway, but had a mid-pack run. At Kansas Speedway, Bobby started second, but a blown engine relegated him to another DNF.  Santos broke his dry spell at Kentucky Speedway when he started fourth and finished third, behind Erik Darnell and Erin Crocker.  Santos placed third in the next race at Kentucky, as well.  The third-generation racer won a pole at Pocono Raceway in early August and qualified fifth at Talladega Superspeedway, but was unable to back up either with a strong finish.

NASCAR career 
In 2007, Santos made his NASCAR Busch Series debut at Richmond International Raceway for the new Riley D'Hondt Motorsports team. He qualified seventh in his #91 Toyota but faded back to a thirtieth-place finish after running in the top 10 at the beginning of the race. He also qualified fourth for the Camping World 200 at New Hampshire Motor Speedway and was running in the top 10 before being hit by a lapped car. He ran two additional races for RDHM but did not finish better than 30th.

Santos has also participated in the Whelen Modified Tour, collecting his first two wins at Thompson International Speedway in October 2007, and the Ice Breaker, also at Thompson International Speedway, in April 2010. He parlayed his season-opening Icebreaker win into the 2010 Whelen Modified Tour championship, collecting a total of four wins and four poles on the season.

Santos ran the 2011 Nationwide Series opener for Jimmy Means in what was a back-up JR Motorsports car after wrecking the 52 in practice; the Earnhardt family has a long friendship with the independent owner and former driver. Santos finished 17th after vowing to run the race in its entirety.

Current career 

After his stint in stock car racing, Santos returned to his roots, racing the full NASCAR Whelen Modified Tour for Bob Garbarino's Mystic Missile Racing team and a limited schedule in all three USAC divisions. Santos also made select appearances in the NEMA ranks in 2009.  Santos' post-NASCAR career has been highlighted by wins in many of the nation's largest midget races, including the Turkey Night Grand Prix and Copper World Classic. He also won the 2020 Little 500 USAC Sprint car race at Anderson Speedway.

He will drive part-time in the NASCAR Nationwide Series in 2012 for Tommy Baldwin Racing and will continue to compete on the NASCAR Whelen Modified Tour behind the wheel of the Tinio Corporation No. 44.

Santos registered back-to-back Musket 250 wins in 2019 and 2020.

Motorsports career results

NASCAR
(key) (Bold – Pole position awarded by qualifying time. Italics – Pole position earned by points standings or practice time. * – Most laps led.)

Nationwide Series

Camping World Truck Series

 Ineligible for series points

Whelen Modified Tour

ARCA Re/Max Series
(key) (Bold – Pole position awarded by qualifying time. Italics – Pole position earned by points standings or practice time. * – Most laps led.)

Superstar Racing Experience
(key) * – Most laps led. 1 – Heat 1 winner. 2 – Heat 2 winner.

 Season still in progress

References

External links
 
 Bobby Santos at USAC Racing

Living people
1985 births
People from Franklin, Massachusetts
Racing drivers from Massachusetts
NASCAR drivers
ARCA Menards Series drivers
USAC Silver Crown Series drivers